was a Japanese explorer of Central Asia.

Biography
He made three trips to Central Asia between 1902 and 1910, all financed by Count Otani. Although he travelled as a priest of the Jōdo Shinshū sect, he was suspected by British and Russian Intelligence of being an officer of the Imperial Japanese Navy.

Tachibana was instrumental in delivery of the part of Dunhuang manuscripts to Japan in 1912.

For more details of Tachibana's expeditions, see Expeditions of Count Otani.

References

 Galambos, Imre (2010). "Japanese ‘spies’ along the Silk Road: British suspicions regarding the second Otani expedition (1908-09)". Japanese religions, Vol. 35 (1 & 2), pp. 33–61.
 Galambos, Imre and Kitsudo Koichi (2012). "Japanese exploration of Central Asia: The Ōtani expeditions and their British connections". Bulletin of the School of Oriental and African Studies 75, pp. 113–134.
 Hopkirk, Peter (1980). Foreign Devils on the Silk Road: The Search for the Lost Cities and Treasures of Chinese Central Asia. Amherst: The University of Massachusetts Press. .

See also
1902 Ōtani expedition

Explorers of Central Asia
Japanese explorers
1890 births
1968 deaths
Jōdo Shinshū Buddhist priests
20th-century Buddhist monks